House of Councillors elections were held in Japan on 12 July 1998.

The LDP under Ryūtarō Hashimoto had restored single-party government in 1996 and was now aiming to also regain clear control of the House of Councillors where it was several seats short of a majority. Instead, it lost 13 seats in the election giving the opposition clear control. Prime minister Hashimoto resigned. Keizō Obuchi was elected LDP president on July 24, defeating Seiroku Kajiyama and Junichirō Koizumi.

On July 30, 1998, Obuchi was designated as prime minister by the Diet against the vote of the House of Councillors where DPJ president Naoto Kan beat Obuchi by 142 to 103 votes. Obuchi entered coalition negotiations in late 1998. In January 1999, the LDP entered a ruling coalition with Ichirō Ozawa's Liberal Party, bringing the government within few seats of a majority; in October 1999, New Komeito also entered the coalition, ending the divided Diet.

Results

By constituency

References

Japan
1998 elections in Japan
1998
July 1998 events in Asia
Election and referendum articles with incomplete results